Hongmei may refer to the following places in China:

Hongmei, Fujian (洪梅镇), a town in Nan'an, Fujian
Hongmei, Guangdong (洪梅镇), a town in Dongguan, Guangdong
Hongmei, Jilin (红梅镇), a town in Meihekou, Jilin
Hongmei Subdistrict (红梅街道), a subdistrict in Tianning District, Changzhou, Jiangsu

See also
Hong Mei (disambiguation)